Lauri Korpikoski (born 28 July 1986) is a Finnish professional ice hockey left winger who is currently playing for HC TPS of the Liiga. Korpikoski has previously played in the NHL for the Arizona Coyotes, Edmonton Oilers, Dallas Stars, Columbus Blue Jackets and the New York Rangers, the organization that drafted him in the first round, 19th overall, at the 2004 NHL Entry Draft.

Playing career
Korpikoski was drafted in the first round, 19th overall, in the 2004 NHL Entry Draft by the New York Rangers. He originally played for TPS' junior team in the SM-liiga before moving up to the main team for the 2004–05 season. He then played two seasons of professional hockey in Finland before joining the Rangers' American Hockey League (AHL) affiliate, the Hartford Wolf Pack, after TPS' 2005–06 season; he played five regular season games and 11 playoff games for Hartford for the team's 2005–06 season.

In 2006–07, Korpikoski had 11 goals and 38 points for the Wolf Pack, while in 2007–08, in his second year with the team, he bested his previous year's totals, scoring 23 goals and having 50 points, also scoring two points in five Calder Cup playoff games. Following Hartford's first round exit from the playoffs, Korpikoski was named to the Rangers' reserves squad for the team's 2008 Stanley Cup playoff run. On 4 May, he dressed for Game 5 of the Eastern Conference Semifinals against the Pittsburgh Penguins, and 2:03 into the game's third period, he scored his first career NHL goal on just his second-ever shot. The goal brought the Rangers to within one goal of tying (which they did), although the team eventually lost in overtime, eliminating them from the playoffs.

After scoring points in every pre-season game in which he played, Korpikoski survived cuts to make the Rangers' 23-man roster for the start of the 2008–09 season, the only rookie to make the team. He later scored his first career regular season NHL goal against Kevin Weekes of the New Jersey Devils on 12 November 2008.

On 13 July 2009, Korpikoski was traded to the Phoenix Coyotes in exchange for Enver Lisin. On 11 July 2013, the Coyotes re-signed Korpikoski to a four-year contract extension.

On 30 June 2015, with two seasons left on his contract, Korpikoski was traded by the rebuilding Coyotes to the Edmonton Oilers in exchange for Boyd Gordon. He scored his first career NHL hat trick on 11 December 2015 against the New York Rangers.

After only one year in Edmonton, on 30 June 2016, Korpikoski was placed on unconditional waivers by the Oilers for the purpose of buying out the final year of his contract.

Before the start of the 2016–17 season, the Calgary Flames signed Korpikoski to a professional try-out contract to attend training camp on 22 September 2016. Despite a successful pre-season with the Flames, Korpikoski was without a contract with the Flames. On 9 October, he was released at his request to pursue a contract offer. The following day he signed a one-year, $1 million contract with the Dallas Stars. Korpokoski cemented his role within the Stars checking lines, scoring 8 goals and 20 points in 60 games before he was dealt with the Stars out of post-season contention, to the Columbus Blue Jackets in exchange for Dillon Heatherington on 1 March 2017.

After ending his NHL career, as an unsigned free agent, Korpikoski joined Swiss club, ZSC Lions of the National League for the duration of the 2017–18 season. In helping the Lions capture the Swiss championship, Korpikoski produced 2 goals and 6 points in 16 post-season games.

Korpikoski left Switzerland after one season, and opted to return to his native Finland, securing a long-term 6-year contract with former club, HC TPS of the Liiga, on May 21, 2018.

Career statistics

Regular season and playoffs

International

References

External links
 

1986 births
Living people
Arizona Coyotes players
EHC Biel players
Columbus Blue Jackets players
Dallas Stars players
Edmonton Oilers players
Finnish ice hockey left wingers
Hartford Wolf Pack players
Ice hockey players at the 2014 Winter Olympics
Medalists at the 2014 Winter Olympics
National Hockey League first-round draft picks
New York Rangers draft picks
New York Rangers players
Olympic bronze medalists for Finland
Olympic ice hockey players of Finland
Olympic medalists in ice hockey
Phoenix Coyotes players
Sportspeople from Turku
HC TPS players
ZSC Lions players